Simon Raynard Fletcher (born February 18, 1962) is a former American football linebacker in the National Football League (NFL). He was drafted by the Denver Broncos in the second round of the 1985 NFL Draft. He played college football at Houston.

Professional career
Fletcher played for the Denver Broncos for his entire NFL career from 1985-1995. In his 11-year career he recorded a Denver Broncos record 97.5 sacks, two interceptions, and 10 fumble recoveries. He shared the NFL record (DeMarcus Ware) for most consecutive games with a sack with 10 until it was broken by Chris Jones of the Kansas City Chiefs in 2018. His four sacks against Minnesota on Nov 4, 1990 tied a franchise record.

In May 2016, Simon Fletcher was inducted into the Broncos' Ring of Fame, along with Denver greats Jason Elam and John Lynch. The three inductees were the 29th, 30th, and 31st members of Denver's Ring of Fame.

He owned a barbecue restaurant named Simon Fletcher's Grid-Iron Grill and BBQ in Fort Morgan, Colorado.

References

1962 births
Living people
People from Bay City, Texas
Players of American football from Texas
American football linebackers
American football defensive ends
Houston Cougars football players
Denver Broncos players
Ed Block Courage Award recipients